Rhombiconus is a synonym of Conus (Stephanoconus) Mörch, 1852 represented as Conus Linnaeus, 1758. These are sea snails, marine gastropod mollusks in the family Conidae, the cone snails and their allies.

Species
 Rhombiconus distans (Hwass in Bruguière, 1792) represented as Conus distans Hwass in Bruguière, 1792 (alternate representation)
 Rhombiconus imperialis (Linnaeus, 1758) represented as Conus imperialis Linnaeus, 1758 (alternate representation)
 Rhombiconus pseudimperialis (Moolenbeek, Zandbergen & Bouchet, 2008) represented as Conus pseudimperialis Moolenbeek, Zandbergen & Bouchet, 2008 (alternate representation)
 Rhombiconus zonatus (Hwass in Bruguière, 1792) represented as Conus zonatus Hwass in Bruguière, 1792 (alternate representation)

References

External links
 To World Register of Marine Species

Conidae